Vernon Oxford (born June 8, 1941) is an American country music singer and guitarist.

Biography
He was born in Rogers, Arkansas, United States. Oxford was raised in Wichita, Kansas, United States, where his father played old-time fiddle. He began playing professionally in Utah in 1960, mostly playing in the Kansas area in the early 1960s, then relocated to Nashville in 1964. In 1965, he met Harlan Howard, who got him signed to RCA Victor and helped him find material to record. He then released seven singles and one LP, Woman Let Me Sing You a Song; none of them charted, and he was soon dropped from RCA.

His career saw a resurgence in Britain, where he was first rediscovered in the middle of the 1970s. A best-of was issued there in 1974, and RCA signed him again to tour there. His hit singles "Shadows of My Mind", "Redneck (The Redneck National Anthem)", and "A Good Old Fashioned Saturday Night Honky Tonk Barroom Brawl" (U.S. Country No. 55, 1977) reinvigorated his career in America; in Britain, he was well known for "I've Got to Get Peter Off Your Mind" and "Field of Flowers". He also recorded a comedy duet with Jim Ed Brown, "Mowing The Lawn". After a break of several years, he began a career as a gospel singer in 1981.

Recording career
Mostly as an independent artist, Oxford has continued to record new material. Oxford's classic recordings have been reissued by numerous labels, including a comprehensive box set from Bear Family Records, and some compilations from Westside UK and the Morello label, which is a division of UK-based Cherry Red Records.

Acting career
As an actor, Oxford has appeared in several films including The Thing Called Love starring River Phoenix, and Coal Miner's Daughter, a 1980 film about American singer Loretta Lynn, who was portrayed by actress Sissy Spacek.

Discography

Albums

Singles

References

External links
 Vernon Oxford's official artist page on CDBaby
 Listing of all Vernon Oxford's songs and alternatives
 

1941 births
Living people
American country singer-songwriters
Singer-songwriters from Arkansas
RCA Victor artists
Country musicians from Arkansas